Stumpp Schuele & Somappa Defence (SSS Defence) is an Indian company that deals in military small arms sectors. It is a subsidiary of Stumpp Schuele & Somappa Springs. Its current focus area is small arms, ammunition and accessories related to small arms.

History 
In 2016, Stumpp Schuele & Somappa Springs, the biggest Indian manufacturer of springs, started deliberating on ways to diversify its business. This led to the creation of SSS Defence. This foray into the business of small arms and ammunition was primarily targeted onto the foreign markets located in Asia, apart from those in India. It became the first private Indian firm to have developed sniper rifles when it’s Viper and Saber rifles were released.

In October 2021, the firm received an order to upgrade some of Indian army's AK-47 rifles to special operations standard. This was the first time a private Indian company received a firearms order,

Products and facilities

Products

Sniper rifles 
SSS Defence has developed two sniper rifles and plans to offer them for trials to Indian special forces, being the Viper and the Saber. SSS Defence says that these rifles have been designed to be compatible with the body structures of Indian soldiers.

 Viper is a sub-MOA sniper rifle chambered for 7.62×51mm or .308 cartridges.
 Saber is a sniper rifle chambered for .338 Lapua Magnum. Its length and height can be adjusted at its butt stock. The picatinny rail system on the rifle has a MIL-STD-1913 rail at a total of 4 positions. It has a weight of around 7 kilograms. When fully equipped with accessories, the Sabre weighs around 9 kilograms. The rifle has an  ambidextrous magazine release. It can be equipped with three different types of barrels with lengths of 24, 26, and 27 inches respectively, its RH Twist being 1:11.25". The receiver system of the rifle is made up of aluminium alloy and the surface of the receiver is coated with cerakote and black oxide.

Assault rifles 
The company has also developed the P-72 family of rifles, with design philosophy similar to the ACR, FN Scar, and Czech CZ Bren 2 Family.

 P-72 Rapid Engagement Combat Rifle (RECR) was designed for general infantry and special operations environments. It is chambered for 7.62x39mm or 7.62x51mm.
 P-72 Recon Carbine is a short, gas piston-operated weapon chambered for 7.62x39mm or 5.56x45mm cartridges.
 P-72 Designated Marksman Rifle (DMR) comes in both 7.62×51mm and 7.62×39mm.

Facilities 
SSS Defence is projected to become the second Indian company to operate a small arms manufacturing facility by the end of 2020. This facility will eventually be capable of producing 80,000 arms per year, starting with an initial 15,000 per year. By 2021, it also plans to operationalise an ammunition manufacturing in Anantapur, Andhra Pradesh. The firm has established a joint venture with Companhia Brasileira de Cartuchos for this purpose. This facility will produce ammunition of calibres such as the 12.7mm, 9mm, 7.62×51mm, 7.62×39mm, .338 Lapua Magnum.

References 

Firearm manufacturers of India
Manufacturing companies based in Bangalore
2017 establishments in Karnataka
Indian companies established in 2017
Manufacturing companies established in 2017